The Bekins Storage Co. Roof Sign is a rooftop sign in Pasadena, California, which originally advertised the Bekins Storage Company. The sign was erected in 1926 and converted to a neon sign in 1929. The sign is now the only surviving large rooftop sign from before World War II in Pasadena, and one of few remaining signs of any type from the period. Similar signs are now banned by Pasadena law, though signs from before 1960 are exempted and listed on a city register. The sign was later renovated to promote the A. American Storage Co. and now advertises Public Storage.

The sign was added to the National Register of Historic Places on October 15, 1997.

References

Buildings and structures on the National Register of Historic Places in Pasadena, California
Buildings and structures completed in 1926
Billboards
U.S. Route 66 in California
Individual signs in the United States
Individual signs on the National Register of Historic Places
Commercial buildings on the National Register of Historic Places in California
1926 establishments in California